Hamonic is a surname.

Notable people with the surname Hamonic include:

 Émile Hamonic, French photographer and publisher
 Travis Hamonic, Canadian ice hockey player

Other 
 Hamonic (steamship),  a passenger vessel designed for service on the Great Lakes


Surnames of French origin